Daniel Harlow is the Jerrold R. Zacharias Career Development Associate Professor of Physics at the Massachusetts Institute of Technology.

Biography 
Harlow was born in Cincinnati and grew up in Boston and Chicago. He received his B.A. from Columbia University in 2006 and his Ph.D. from Stanford University in 2012. He was a postdoctoral fellow at Princeton University and Harvard University before joining MIT's faculty in July 2017.

His research is focused on understanding black holes and cosmology, viewed through the lens of quantum field theory and quantum gravity.

He won the New Horizons in Physics Prize in 2019 for "fundamental insights about quantum information, quantum field theory, and gravity." He was also named a Sloan Research Fellow in 2019. In 2020, he was named a Packard Fellow.

References 

Living people
Columbia College (New York) alumni
Massachusetts Institute of Technology faculty
Stanford University alumni
Year of birth missing (living people)
American physicists
People from Cincinnati
Scientists from Ohio
Sloan Research Fellows